Moscow is an unincorporated community in the town of Stowe in Lamoille County, Vermont, United States.

References

Unincorporated communities in Vermont
Unincorporated communities in Lamoille County, Vermont